Club Dread (also known as Broken Lizard's Club Dread) is a 2004 comedy slasher film directed by Jay Chandrasekhar and written by and starring the comedy troupe Broken Lizard, Chandrasekhar, Kevin Heffernan, Steve Lemme, Paul Soter, Erik Stolhanske, Brittany Daniel, and Bill Paxton. The film follows a group of staff members on a tropical island resort, where an unknown killer begins a murder spree.

Though the story is set on an island in Costa Rica, filming took place in Mexico.

Club Dread was released on February 27, 2004, and grossed $7.6 million at the box office on a budget of $8.6 million, becoming a financial failure. The film received mixed-to-negative reviews from critics.

Plot

Pleasure Island is a resort off the coast of Costa Rica, owned by famous, washed-up musician Coconut Pete. Staff members Rolo, Stacy, and Kelly sneak into the jungle to have sex, where they are ambushed and murdered by a masked figure.

The resort staff discover another body behind the kitchen, and Dave relates a story about a former employee named Phil Colletti who lost his mind and murdered his fellow staff members, before castrating himself and running away. Putman alerts the others when he finds Cliff murdered in a hedge maze. A message left by the killer suggests that he is targeting only the staff. All communication devices and transportation have been stolen or destroyed.

Hank, a former FBI serial killing investigator, convinces the staff to continue with their jobs and allow him to catch the killer. Two staff members decide to warn the guests and they too are murdered by the killer.

The staff begins to suspect one of the guests, Penelope. Juan, believing her innocent, tries to eliminate her as a suspect. Putman disappears into the jungle after having a nightmare. Sam and Dave find a shrine of photos of Lars and his friends, in which all of the faces except Lars' have been replaced with Pete's; suspicion turns on Lars and the staff lock Lars in the resort's drunk tank. The killer attempts to kill Jenny by dropping a television into the swimming pool, but Jenny escapes just in time, ultimately killing Dirk and causing a power failure. Putman returns, and he and Jenny deduce that Lars is not the killer, and return to the drunk tank to release him, only to find that he has escaped.

When Pete is found dead, the staff members turn on each other. Partway through the argument, Lars returns and discovers Pete's body. Just as everything escalates, Jenny calms everyone else down and tries to convince the group that they must work together to survive until the shuttle from the mainland returns for the guests. The staff split up and Dave restores the electricity, seconds before being beheaded by the killer. Jenny and Lars find Dave's severed head and, thinking the killer is coming for them, hide under a bed. Jenny places a nearby pair of handcuffs on what she believed to be the killer's feet, only to realize that she handcuffed Putman by mistake. Just as Jenny and Lars come out of hiding, the killer appears and Putman tells them to hide before being killed.

During a party in the nightclub, the killer then reveals the corpses of his previous victims to the guests, causing a panic. Juan returns to join Lars and Jenny, with the killer's machete in his hand. Penelope, Juan, Lars and Jenny find Sam's body in a mud bath. While they consider their next move, Sam leaps from the bath and snatches his machete from Lars, revealing himself as the killer. He grabs Lars before revealing his motive: Pete had intended to sell the island, but ultimately decided to give the island to Dave, who Sam assumed would mismanage the resort and destroy it, instead of him. Lars grabs the machete, allowing the others to escape. Jenny and Juan lock themselves in the nightclub. They see Sam drowning Penelope in a large tank. Juan smashes the tank and rescues Penelope. Sam prepares to kill them, but Lars appears and stabs Sam.

Sam pursues the four as they escape through the jungle. Cornered on a cliff, they jump to the water below. They find the resort's damaged boats, and try to cobble together enough working parts to leave the island. Sam appears and kills Juan, then attacks Jenny and Penelope. Lars breaks his vow of pacifism and overcomes Sam, and Sam is bisected by a rope attached to the power boat. Just as everything seems to settle down, Sam's upper half emerges and grabs Penelope, but Lars tosses him into the ocean, before they motor away. As they do so, Sam's lower half continues to pursue them.

Cast

Pleasure Island staff
 Brittany Daniel as Jenny, the aerobics instructor on Pleasure Island and Lars' eventual lover
 Kevin Heffernan as Lars Bronkhorst, a buddhist, pacifist and the recently hired Masseur on Pleasure Island
 Erik Stolhanske as Sam, the aptly named "Fun Police", in charge of games and activities on Pleasure Island
 Steve Lemme as Juan Castillo, a Nicaraguan staff member on Pleasure Island, and an athletic divemaster
 Jay Chandrasekhar as Puttman Livingston, a British staff member and tennis instructor on Pleasure Island
 Paul Soter as Dave "DJ Dave" Conable, a staff member and the disk jockey for the club on Pleasure island, and Coconut Pete's nephew
 Bill Paxton as Pete "Coconut Pete" Wabash, a washed-up folk singer, owner of Pleasure Island and Dave's uncle
 M. C. Gainey as Hank, a southern-accented former director of the FBI Homicide Department, acting as Coconut Pete's bodyguard and best friend
 Lindsay Price as Yu, a Japanese-American staff member and waitress on Pleasure Island
 Julio Bekhor as Carlos, the groundskeeper on Pleasure Island
 Dan Montgomery Jr. as Rollo, a polygamist and staff member on Pleasure Island
 Elena Lyons as Stacy, an assistant to Putman on Pleasure Island and one of Rolo's girlfriends
 Tanja Reichert as Kellie, an understudy to Yu, waitress on Pleasure Island and one of Rolo's girlfriends
 Richard Perello as Cliff, a menial worker on Pleasure Island
 Ryan Falkner as Marcel, one of the officials on Pleasure Island

Other characters
 Greg Cipes as Trevor, Pleasure Island guest
 Michael Weaver as Roy, Pleasure Island guest and Manny's best friend
 Nat Faxon as Manny, Pleasure Island guest and Roy's best friend
 Samm Levine as Dirk, Pleasure Island guest
 Jordan Ladd as Penelope, an Alaskan gymnast, Pleasure Island guest and Juan's eventual girlfriend
 Paco Mauri as Mainland detective
 Tony Amendola as Mainland detective's partner

Soundtrack
On one of the disc's commentary tracks the filmmakers state that they screened the film for Jimmy Buffett, who was so amused that he requested permission to sing some of the film's songs on one of his live tours.

Critical reception
Club Dread received mostly negative reviews. It has a score of 45 out of 100 on review aggregator website Metacritic based on 28 reviews. On Rotten Tomatoes, it has an approval rating of 29% based on 101 reviews. The site's critical consensus reads: "Comedy is too hit-or-miss in this slasher spoof". Dave Kehr of The New York Times wrote that "From Broken Lizard, the comedy troupe that delivered the low-budget sleeper Super Troopers in 2001, Club Dread is a disappointingly routine horror movie spoof that follows the well-worn path of the Scream and Scary Movie franchises". Critic Roger Ebert gave the film a rating of two-and-a-half out of five stars and wrote that "Whether it works or not is a little hard to say; like "Super Troopers" (2002), the previous film by the Broken Lizard comedy troupe, it has lovable performances, very big laughs, and then some down time while everybody (in the cast as well as the audience) waits to see what  next".

Alternate version
In 2005, an unrated edition was released to DVD. This version of the film contains an additional 15 minutes of footage for a 118-minute running time. It features several extended scenes, and also restores a subplot involving two cops  that was absent in the theatrical edition. Director Jay Chandrasekhar states in one of the disc's commentary tracks that the original R-rated version is still the director's cut.

References

External links
 
 
 
 
 

2004 comedy horror films
2000s slasher films
2004 films
American comedy horror films
American parody films
American teen comedy films
Mexican slasher films
Slasher comedy films
Broken Lizard
2000s English-language films
Films directed by Jay Chandrasekhar
Films scored by Nathan Barr
Films set in Costa Rica
Films shot in Mexico
Fox Searchlight Pictures films
American serial killer films
American sex comedy films
American slasher films
Parodies of horror
2000s sex comedy films
2004 LGBT-related films
2004 comedy films
2000s American films
2000s Mexican films